Aoraia hespera is a species of moth of the family Hepialidae. It is endemic to New Zealand.

References

External links
Hepialidae genera

Moths described in 1994
Hepialidae
Moths of New Zealand